Sarli-ye Olya (also Romanized as Sārlī-ye ‘Olyā and Sārlī ‘Olyā; also known as Sārlī-ye Bālā) is a village in Fajr Rural District, in the Central District of Gonbad-e Qabus County, Golestan Province, Iran. At the 2006 census, its population was 1,250, in 324 families.

References 

Populated places in Gonbad-e Kavus County